Peru Township is one of the nineteen townships of Huron County, Ohio, United States. As of the 2010 census the population of the township was 1,105.

Geography
Located in the western part of the county, it borders the following townships:
Ridgefield Township - north
Norwalk Township - northeast corner
Bronson Township - east
Fairfield Township - southeast corner
Greenfield Township - south
Norwich Township - southwest corner
Sherman Township - west
Lyme Township - northwest corner

No municipalities are located in Peru Township.

Name and history
Statewide, the only other Peru Township is located in Morrow County.

Government
The township is governed by a three-member board of trustees, who are elected in November of odd-numbered years to a four-year term beginning on the following January 1. Two are elected in the year after the presidential election and one is elected in the year before it. There is also an elected township fiscal officer, who serves a four-year term beginning on April 1 of the year after the election, which is held in November of the year before the presidential election. Vacancies in the fiscal officership or on the board of trustees are filled by the remaining trustees.

References

External links
County website

Townships in Huron County, Ohio
Townships in Ohio